Selina Gasparin (born 3 April 1984) is a Swiss biathlete.

Biography
She won a silver medal in the Individual at 2014 Winter Olympics.

Gasparin competed in the 2010 Winter Olympics for Switzerland. Her best performance was 40th in the individual. She also finished 56th in the sprint and 48th in the pursuit.

As of February 2013, her best performance at the Biathlon World Championships was 10th, as part of the 2012 Swiss mixed relay team. Her best individual performance is 12th in the 2012 sprint.

As of February 2013, Gasparin's best individual performance in the Biathlon World Cup is 4th in the individual at Östersund in 2012/13. Her best overall finish in the Biathlon World Cup is 29th, in 2010/11 and 2011/12.

On 6 December 2013, Gasparin won her first World cup event by finishing first in a sprint competition in Hochfilzen. A week later she took another win in sprint in Annecy-Le Grand Bornand.

She is the older sister of fellow biathletes Elisa Gasparin and Aita Gasparin. She married Russian cross-country skier and fellow Olympic medalist Ilia Chernousov in June 2014. In September 2014 Gasparin announced that she was pregnant and would miss the 2014-15 season.

Biathlon results

Olympic Games

Individual victories
2 victories (2 Sp)

Cross-country skiing results
All results are sourced from the International Ski Federation (FIS).

World Championships

World Cup

Season standings

References

1984 births
Living people
People from Maloja District
Biathletes at the 2010 Winter Olympics
Biathletes at the 2014 Winter Olympics
Biathletes at the 2018 Winter Olympics
Biathletes at the 2022 Winter Olympics
Swiss female biathletes
Swiss female cross-country skiers
Olympic biathletes of Switzerland
Medalists at the 2014 Winter Olympics
Olympic silver medalists for Switzerland
Olympic medalists in biathlon
Sportspeople from Graubünden
21st-century Swiss women